David Chutter is a former Canadian politician, who served as a BC Liberal Member of the Legislative Assembly of British Columbia from 2001 to 2005, representing the riding of Yale-Lillooet.

External links
David Chutter

British Columbia Liberal Party MLAs
Living people
Year of birth missing (living people)
21st-century Canadian politicians